Arcor is an Argentine confectionery company.

Arcor may also refer to:

 Arcor (telecommunications), a German telecommunications company
 Arcore (Lombard: Arcor), a municipality in Lombardy, Italy

See also
 ARCore, a software development kit